Siempre Contigo (English: Always With You) is the twelfth album from Mexican pop music singer and actress Lucero. It was released in 1994, selling more than 700,000 units till today in Mexico and United States. It reached #15 in Billboard Top Latin Albums.

This was the third album written, produced, and arranged by Rafael Pérez Botija for the singer, and was another success for both. The producer also presented another song to be included called "Un Mundo sin Amor" (A World Without Love), but since the singer decided that this album was about victorious love, the song was not included. Lucero told Mexican magazine Eres that she was very proud of this album because it had something for everybody, and was an album to be played in every home for the whole family.

The first single was the title track "Siempre Contigo" which hit No. 1 in Mexico and No. 4 in United States. Once again Lucero was face to face with Luis Miguel for the top of the Mexican charts. "Siempre Contigo" was at No. 1 for 3 weeks, when Luis Miguel's "El Día Que Me Quieras" hit the top spot.

With the release of the second single ("Quién Soy Yo", English: Who Am I), Lucero had to settle for the #2 rug of the charts, because of Luis Miguel's "La Media Vuelta".

By the time of the release of the third single "Palabras" (English: Words), she spent 5 weeks at the top. Also a fourth and a fifth single were taken from the album: "Como Perro al Sol" and "Volvamos a Empezar".

Lucero was starring in 1995 on the soap opera Lazos de Amor and a re-release of the album was planned to include the song "Lazos de Amor" and increase sales (the album at the time had 350,000 copies sold), however the plans were dropped and instead an EP with the song and 4 instrumental tracks was released.

Track listing
The album is composed by 11 songs, all of them were arranged and produced by Rafael Pérez Botija.

Singles

Chart performance
This was the 6th album of Lucero that entered to the list of Billboard. The album peaked No. 15 for one week.

Credits

Personnel
 Recorded at: Criteria (Miami), Record One (LA) Smecky (Prague), Kirios (Madrid)
 Recording engineers: Carlos Nieto, Ray Pyle, Javier Vacas, Juraj Durovic.
 Mixing: Kirios Studios by Carlos Nieto
 Mastering: Steve Marcussen
 Arrangements, piano, keyboards and programming: Rafael Perez Botija
 All vocals: Lucero
 Photography: Adolfo Perez Butron
 Wardrobe: Frattina

Musicians
 Bass: Neil Stubenhaus
 Drums: Mike Bayrd
 Guitars: Tim Pierce, Jose Antonio Barrera, Rene Toledo
 Metals: Ed Calles
 Sax: Tony Concepción
 Trumpet: Jim Hacker
 Strings: Philharmonic Orchestra of Prague. Director: Mario Klemens

References

1994 albums
Lucero (entertainer) albums